Jocelyn is the second album by Jocelyn Enriquez, released in 1997 on Classified Records / Timber! Records / Tommy Boy Records. It features her biggest mainstream hits to date, "Do You Miss Me?" and "A Little Bit of Ecstasy". "Even If" was opted for a single and remixed by Soul Solution however "Get Into the Rhythm" was the 3rd and last single released from the album. "Stay With Me" was commercially released in Brazil.

After several delays the album was finally released in May 1997. The notable differences between released versions were the sequence which included a pop R&B song titled "Where Is The Love", an introduction track to "Kailanman", two tracks with voicemail recordings, and three mixes of "Do You Miss Me", the cover of Yazoo's "Only You" was remixed, three new songs "Everything I Need", "If I'm Falling In Love", and "Can You Feel It", the Information Society inspired Running Mix for "Do You Miss Me", and the Freefloor Mix for "A Little Bit of Ecstasy".

The track "Kailanman" is a cover of a song by Maso, which itself is a Tagalog cover of the 1989 song "Saigo No Iiwake" by Japanese singer Hideaki Tokunaga.

The album led to Jocelyn being able to tour her native Philippines in 1997 where she appeared and performed on various talk shows and venues from Manila to Cebu.

Track listing

Charts
Album - Billboard (United States)

Singles - Billboard (United States)

References

1997 albums
Jocelyn Enriquez albums
Tommy Boy Records albums